Fier was a 50-gun ship of the line of the French Navy, launched in 1745. Designed by engineer Chapelle, she was one of the last 60-gun ships built before the advent of the more modern and standard 64-guns. She was reduced to a 50-gun and served into the 1780, taking part in the War of American Independence. She was sold in 1782 to be used as a merchantman.

Career 
On 22 July 1746, Fier and Flore captured the privateer Pearl. She took part in the Battle of Minorca on 20 May 1756 under Captain d'Erville. In 1670, she was under Captain Marquisan.

In 1762, she was under Pierre de Moriès-Castellet.

In 1772 she was under Captain Du Chaffault in the squadron under Orvilliers. She took part in the Battle of Ushant on 27 July 1778 under Turpin du Breuil.

Fate 
Fier was sold in 1782 to be used as a merchantman.

Citations and references 
Citations

References
 
  (1671-1870)

External links
 
 

Ships of the line of the French Navy
1745 ships